Coup is the debut album by The New Regime, a solo project by Ilan Rubin, the former drummer of Lostprophets and current drummer of Nine Inch Nails and Angels and Airwaves. In addition to songs previously released on his Myspace page, he recorded two more songs for this album, as well as singing and playing all the instruments by himself for the entirety of it.

It was released on November 18, 2008 as a digital download on digital music stores such as iTunes, Amazon and eMusic. It was also released as a free download on the official Nine Inch Nails web site.

Track listing 

 "The Collapse" - 5:14
 "Order Restored" - 5:07
 "All These Changes" - 4:42
 "Take Control" - 3:58
 "Time Erase" - 3:01
 "Haunt My Mind" - 4:03
 "This War Time" - 3:58
 "The Credit "We" Deserve" - 4:51
 "Tap Dancing In A Minefield" - 4:04
 "Somethings" - 3:47

Personnel

 Ilan Rubin - drums, vocals, piano, keyboards, guitars, bass guitar, lyrics, production
 Aaron Rubin - produced, engineered, mixed

External links 
 The New Regime Official Website
 The New Regime Myspace
 Coup Release Announcement

References 

Ilan Rubin albums
2008 debut albums